Sokoro is a town near the northwestern extremity of Ivory Coast. It is a sub-prefecture of Minignan Department in Folon Region, Denguélé District. The town is situated near the border with Mali, south of the neighboring Yanfolila Cercle. One kilometre northwest of town is a border crossing.

Sokoro was a commune until March 2012, when it became one of 1126 communes nationwide that were abolished.

In 2014, the population of the sub-prefecture of Sokoro was 6,704.

Villages
The 6 villages of the sub-prefecture of Sokoro and their population in 2014 are:
 Djirila Bada  (450)
 Keningouara  (237)
 Madina  (1 915)
 Nabagala  (1 277)
 Sokoro  (2 266)
 Tiemba  (559)

References

Sub-prefectures of Folon Region
Ivory Coast–Mali border crossings
Former communes of Ivory Coast